The Nordic Championships in badminton was an international open held in the Scandinavian states from 1962 until 1999. 
Between 1962 and 1988 it was held annually. Afterwards it took place biannually, which increased to 3 years once with the change from the even years up to 1992 into odd years starting in 1995.

Winners

References

Badminton tournaments
Recurring sporting events established in 1962
Recurring events disestablished in 1999
Sport in Scandinavia
Inter-Nordic sports competitions